The Golden Kela Awards 
are a satirical take on Bollywood that award the worst performances in Hindi cinema each year. Created by Random Magazine, winners are selected each year by an online poll and receive an award in the shape of a golden banana (केला kelā in Hindi). The first award ceremony took place on 7 March 2009 in New Delhi (India). The fifth award ceremony was held on 30 March 2013. Jaspal Bhatti made a special appearance at the inaugural event, dishonoring the Indian film talent of the year 2008.  The intention behind the Golden Kela is to ridicule the Hindi film stars and acknowledge the worst of Indian Cinema. Since, several award ceremonies each year celebrate the best of Hindi Cinema, Random Magazine and the Sundaas Film Institute chose to be different by giving away the Best of the Worst of Indian Cinema. Golden Kela Awards are not meant to insult anyone. It is just a way to make it a laughter exercise, a therapy of sorts to forget about the failures and look at what went wrong with the movie and the act. Abhishek Bachchan came to the Golden Kela Awards in 2010 and accepted the Dara Singh Award for his attempt to speak with an American accent in Delhi 6

Categories

Main awards
 Worst Movie
 Worst Director
 Worst Actor (Male)
 Worst Actor (Female)
 Worst Supporting Actor (Male)
 Worst Supporting Actor (Female)
 Worst Debutant
 Baawra Ho Gaya Hai Ke Award (literally, "Have you gone mad?")
 Most Irritating Song
 Most Atrocious Lyrics

Special categories
 Worst Pair
 Lajja Award for Worst Treatment of a Serious Issue
 Dara Singh Award For Worst Accent
 Shakti Kapoor Award For Misogyny
 Bas Kijiye Bahut Ho Gaya Award (literally, "Stop it, enough!")

Winners

2009
Winners List:

Most Atrocious Lyrics: Anvita Dutt for Lucky Boy from Bachna Ae Haseeno
Most Unoriginal Story: Hari Puttar: A Comedy of Terrors
Most Irritating Song of the Year: Tandoori Nights from Karzzzz

2010

2011

2012

2013

The nominations for 5th Golden Kela awards were announced on 22 December 2012. Following are the nominees of the 5th Golden Kela:

Most Atrocious Lyrics
Anvita Dutt Ishq Wala Love (Student of the Year)
Amitabh Bhattacharya: Halkat Jawani (Heroine)
Shabbir Ahmed: Bipasha Bipasha (Jodi Breakers)
Shabbir Ahmed: Po Po (Son of Sardaar)
Sameer Anjaan: Chinta Ta Chita Chita (Rowdy Rathore)
Himesh Reshammiya: Hookah Bar (Khiladi 786)

Baawra Ho Gaya Hai Ke Award
 
 Homi Adajania: For following up Being Cyrus with Cocktail. We had expectations from you, Homi.
 Sanjay Khanduri: For taking his own awesome Ek Chalis Ki Last Local, setting it in Delhi and making Kismat Love Paisa Dilli... and doing a horrible job of it.
 Ali Azmat: For sounding like a parody of his former self in the song Maula from Jism 2.
 Indian Moviegoers: For spending more than 600 crores on Bol Bachchan, Housefull 2, Agneepath, Rowdy Rathore and Ek Tha Tiger (we'll keep adding the crores as figures keep coming in for Khiladi 786 and Dabangg 2).

Anti-Kela Awards

 Paan Singh Tomar - For reminding us why we always (secretly) loved the dacoits more than the heroes.
Gangs of Wasseypur - For reminding us that s***a Hindustan mein jab tak cinema hai, log c*****a bante rahenge.
Kahaani - For showing that a film doesn't need a 'hero' to be a hit.
Vicky Donor - For showing that you can make a 'family comedy' about sperm donation (and reminding us why we used to like Annu Kapoor)

2014

Worst Actor (male) - Ajay Devgan for Himmatwala

Worst Actor (female)- Sonakshi Sinha for Everything She Did

Worst director - Sanjay Leela Bhansali for Goliyon Ki Raasleela Ram-Leela

Worst film - Himmatwala

Supporting Actor (Male) - Aditya Roy Kapur for Yeh Jawaani Hai Deewani

Supporting Actor (Female) - Deepika Padukone, Jacqueline Fernandez and
Ameesha Patel for Race 2

Most Annoying Song - Party All Night from Boss

Most Atrocious Lyrics - Sameer for Raghupati Raghav (Krrish 3)

Most Pointless Sequel/Remake Award – Himmatwala

Why Are You Still Trying Award – Shahid Kapoor for R... Rajkumar

Baawra Ho Gaya Hai Ke Award - Aamir Khan for Dhoom 3

Worst Debut of the Year - Leander Paes for Rajdhani Express

Anti-Kela Awards

Go Goa Gone
Saheb, Biwi Aur Gangster Returns
The Lunchbox

2015
The winners for the 7th Golden Kela Awards:

Worst Actor (Male) - Arjun Kapoor for Gunday & Everything Else

Worst Actor (Female) - Sonakshi Sinha for Action Jackson and Lingaa and Holiday

Worst Debut - Tiger Shroff for Heropanti

Worst Director - Prabhu Deva for Action Jackson

Worst Film - Humshakals

Most Irritating Song - Blue hai Paani Paani from Yaariyan

Most Atrocious Lyrics - Shabbir Ahmed for Ice Cream from The Xpose

Baawra Ho Gaya Hai Ke Award - Abhishek Sharma for The Shaukeens

RGV Ki Aag Award for Most Pointless Remake/Sequel - Bang Bang!

Why Are You Still Trying Award - Sonam Kapoor

Bas Kijiye Bahut Ho Gaya Award - Yo Yo Honey Singh

Dara Singh Award for the Worst Accent - Priyanka Chopra for Mary Kom

Khooni Dracula Award for Most Creatively Named Horror Film - 6-5=2

Shakti Kapoor Award for Misogyny In Film - Action Jackson

Jadoo Award for Most Convincing Looking Alien - akshay kumar  for fugli 

Fanaa Award for Most Pointlessly Controversial Film - PK

2016
Worst Actor (Male) - Arjun Kapoor for Tevar

Worst Actor (Female) - Sonam Kapoor for Prem Ratan Dhan Payo

Worst Director - Sooraj Barjatya for Prem Ratan Dhan Payo

Worst Film  - Prem Ratan Dhan Payo

Most Annoying Song  - Prem Ratan Dhan Payo (Title track)

Most Atrocious Lyrics - Alfaaz for Birthday Bash from Dilliwali Zaalim Girlfriend

Most Pointless Sequel/Remake Award – MSG-2 The Messenger

Why Are You Still Trying Award – Imran Khan

Manoj Kumar Award for Historical "Accuracy" – Bajirao Mastani

Dara Singh Award for Worst Accent - Randeep Hooda for Main Aur Charles

Sangh Parivaar Award – Gerua from Dilwale

Shakti Kapoor Award for Misogyny – Pyaar Ka Punchnama 2

Bas Kijiye Bahut Ho Gaya Award – Sooraj Barjatya

What The Hell Award – Sonam Kapoor

Baawra Ho Gaya Hai Ke Award – Vikas Bahl for Shaandaar

See also
Golden Raspberry Awards
Ghanta Awards
Pigasus Award
Darwin Award
Youth Film Handbook

References

External links
Golden Kela Official Website
Random Magazine Official Website
Random Magazine Official Youtube Channel
Official Facebook Page
Official Twitter Page

Bollywood film awards
Ironic and humorous awards
Indian film awards
Lists of worsts
Awards established in 2009